The Embassy of the United States in Yangon represents the official diplomatic mission of the American government in Myanmar (Burma), provides assistance to American citizens and issues visas to foreign nationals, for the purposes of visiting and immigration.

Location
The American Embassy was formerly located in Downtown Yangon, on Merchant Street between 33rd Street and 34th Street, facing the Independence Monument park and Yangon City Hall on the other side of the park. Sule Pagoda was one block north on the west side of the park. The building was formerly a Bank in a  colonial-era structure. In August 2007, the embassy moved to new premises further from Downtown, because of security concerns at the old site. From 2001 to 2005, as a consequence of the September 11 attacks, roadblocks and security barriers were placed in front the building, to seal off traffic.

The new embassy site, located on University Avenue Road in Yangon's Kamayut Township, facing Inya Lake, was reportedly constructed at the cost of $60 million USD.

Controversy
According to WikiLeaks cables, the embassy funded some of the civil society groups in Burma that forced the government to suspend a controversial Chinese Myitsone Dam on the Irrawaddy river.  
According to media reports citing documents published by Germany's Der Spiegel in 2010, the embassy is the site of an electronic surveillance facility used to monitor telephones and communications networks, run jointly by the Central Intelligence Agency and National Security Agency group known as Special Collection Service.

References

External links
 Official website

Myanmar–United States relations
Yangon
United States